Cochylimorpha fluens is a species of moth of the family Tortricidae. It is found in Afghanistan and north-eastern Iran.

The wingspan is 23–27 mm. The ground colour of the forewings is whitish with yellowish-ochreous dots and mixed with glossy scales. The hindwings are ochreous yellow.

References

Moths described in 1970
Cochylimorpha
Taxa named by Józef Razowski
Moths of Asia